Muhammad Husayn al-Dhahabi was an Al-Azhar scholar and former Egyptian minister of religious endowments. He was a critic of the militant jihadist movement that had splintered from the mainstream Muslim Brotherhood. In July 1977, he was kidnapped by the radical group Takfir wal-Hijra, who held him hostage and demanded the release of imprisoned members of their movement. When their demand was not met, they executed al-Dhahabi. Following his execution, the government of Anwar Sadat cracked down on militant Islamic organizations in Egypt.

References

20th-century Egyptian politicians
Egyptian Sunni Muslim scholars of Islam
Endowments Ministers of Egypt